Ernesto Calindri (5 February 1909 – 9 June 1999) was an Italian theater and film actor. He appeared in 40 films between 1938 and 1989.

Selected filmography
 Golden Arrow (1935)
 It Always Ends That Way (1939)
 The Children Are Watching Us (1944)
 A Night of Fame (1949)
 Songs in the Streets (1950)
 L'ultimo amante (1955)
 The Most Wonderful Moment (1957)
 Policarpo (1959)

References

External links

1909 births
1999 deaths
Italian male film actors
People from Certaldo
20th-century Italian male actors
Deaths from cerebrovascular disease